Lewis Cass Crow (November 3, 1851 – August 28, 1938) was an American politician in the state of Washington. He served in the Washington State Senate from 1895 to 1899 and from 1901 to 1903.

References

Democratic Party Washington (state) state senators
1851 births
1938 deaths
People from Johnson County, Indiana